The British Annals of Medicine, Pharmacy, Vital Statistics, and General Science was a weekly publication edited by William Farr that ran from only January to August 1837. Although short-lived, it was succeeded by Farr's other journals and was extremely influential in the development of vital statistics.

References 

Weekly journals
Publications established in 1837
Publications disestablished in 1837
English-language journals
General medical journals